Euctemon (gen. Εὐκτήμωνος; fl. 432 BC) was an Athenian astronomer. He was a contemporary of Meton and worked closely with this astronomer.  Little is known of his work apart from his partnership with Meton and what is mentioned by Ptolemy. With Meton, he made a series of observations of the solstices (the points at which the Sun is seen at the greatest distance from the equator) in order to determine the length of the tropical year. Geminus and Ptolemy quote him as a source on the rising and setting of the stars. Pausanias's Description of Greece names Damon and Philogenes and Euctemon's children.

The lunar crater Euctemon is named after him.

References

External links
Imago Mundi: Euctemon
The Ancient Library
Greek Astronomy 

5th-century BC Athenians
Ancient Greek astronomers
Year of birth unknown
Year of death unknown
5th-century BC astronomers